Gary Gray may refer to:
Gary Gray (actor) (1936–2006), child actor in the 1940s
Gary Gray (baseball) (born 1952), former Major League Baseball first baseman
Gary Gray (basketball) (born 1945), former NBA guard
Gary Gray (footballer) (born 1953), Australian rules footballer
Gary Gray (politician) (born 1958), British-born Australian member of parliament
Gary Gray (recording engineer), Canadian recording engineer
Gary LeRoi Gray (born 1986), American actor and voice actor
F. Gary Gray (born 1969), American film and music video director